László Halász may refer to:
 László Halász (cyclist)
 László Halász (rower)
 Laszlo Halasz (conductor)